Prince William Forest Park is protected forest in the U.S. state of Virginia within Prince William County (and very partially Stafford County), located adjacent to the Marine Corps Base Quantico near the town of Dumfries.

The park serves as the largest example of Eastern Piedmont forest in the National Park System. The park also protects the Quantico Creek watershed. It is a sanctuary for numerous native plant and animal species.

The park was developed by Works Progress Administration workers after the Great Depression. Landscaping and structures were designed by National Park Service architects. Four camp areas are listed individually on the National Register of Historic Places:
 Goodwill Historic District, Chopawamsic RDA Camp 1
 Mawavi Historic District, Chopawamsic RDA Camp 2
 Orenda/SP-26 Historic District, Chopawamsic RDA Camp 3
 Pleasant Historic District, Chopawamsic RDA Camp 4

The park also includes the Cabin Branch Pyrite Mine Historic District, listed on the National Register of Historic Places in 2002. The park itself was designed as the Prince William Forest Park Historic District in 2012.

History 
The land on which Prince William Forest Park now resides was once used by Native Americans of the Archaic period. The Native Americans would use the area for hunting, gathering, and camping. Many artifacts from the archaic people have been found throughout the park.

The park was erected where once the town of Batestown stood. It was an enclave for freed slaves named for Mary Bates, the matriarch of the community.

Between 1933 and 1937, the Federal Government began implementing a Resettlement Administration program to form Chopawamsic Recreational Demonstration Area, where rural farmers were supposed to relocate for more fertile land. The RA bought 79 pieces of property in both Hickory Ridge and Batestown and condemned another 48, to form a new recreation area. However, the RA often made no effort to actually resettle the displaced residents.

The area residents resisted the relocation efforts, sometimes retreating into the park boundaries to escape detection. This continued until the beginning of World War II, where the park was taken over by the Office of Strategic Services as a spy training ground. The park was surrounded by barbed wire and fences, and patrolled by dogs and armed guards. All remaining forty-four holdouts were evicted, some literally carried away screaming.

At the end of the war, the displaced residents hoped their land would be restored, but to date these families have received no compensation. Instead, the property was turned over to the National Park Service and renamed Prince William Forest Park.

Recreational opportunities 
A variety of recreational opportunities are available, which include:

 Wildlife viewing
  of hiking trails. Most of these trails either go to a historical/cultural destination such as Pyrite Mine or follow Quantico Creek with views of its small waterfalls.
  of bicycle accessible roads and trails.
 Several tent camping options, including family, group and backcountry camping are available as well as rustic cabin camping, and a full-service, concessionaire-operated RV campground, are available.

Cultural resources 
The park’s cultural resources are also varied. They include:

 The remnants of Joplin, Hickory Ridge, and Batestown, three small communities evicted for the park’s establishment
 The reclaimed remnants of the Cabin Branch Pyrite Mine along Quantico Creek
 The reclaimed remnants of the Greenwood gold mine
 Products of the Civilian Conservation Corps (CCC), which built the facilities, roads and lakes from 1936 to 1942.
 The U.S. Army’s Office of Strategic Services (OSS) which used the land exclusively for training spies and radio operators between 1942 and 1945

Wildlife
Prince William Forest Park is most notably home to mammalian species such as  White-tailed deer, Black bear, Beaver, Red fox, and Coyote. Deer in particular can be seen almost anywhere in the park. A variety of bird species, such as the Hooded warbler, the Wood thrush, and the Red-shouldered hawk, can also be found. Reptiles such as Eastern black rat snakes have been seen in and around logs and brush areas, and Eastern box turtles can often be found, especially after a light rain. There are a number of amphibians that inhabit the park, such as the American toad, Green Frog, and Cope's gray tree frog can be spotted in the park, as can salamanders such as the Marbled salamander and the Eastern red-backed salamander. Various skinks can be seen around sunny areas of the trails as well.

See also

 Breckenridge Reservoir
 List of parks in the Baltimore–Washington metropolitan area

References

External links
 National Park Service: Official Prince William Forest Park website
 Friends of Prince William Forest Park
 Prince William Forest Park, National Park Service at Google Cultural Institute

 
Parks in Prince William County, Virginia
National Park Service areas in Virginia
Civilian Conservation Corps in Virginia
Historic American Buildings Survey in Virginia
Historic American Engineering Record in Virginia
Protected areas established in 1936
1936 establishments in Virginia
National Park Service rustic in Virginia